Events in the year 1829 in Mexico.

Incumbents 

 Guadalupe Victoria – President of Mexico until April 1
 Vicente Guerrero – interim President of Mexico, April 1 until December 17
 José María Bocanegra – interim President of Mexico, December 18 until December 23
 Pedro Vélez, Lucas Alamán, and Luis de Quintanar – Executive Triumvirate, December 23 until December 31

Governors
 Chiapas: José Diego Lara
 Chihuahua: 
 Coahuila: José María Viesca
 Durango:  
 Guanajuato: 
 Jalisco: José Justo Corro/José Ignacio Cañedo y Arróniz
 State of Mexico:  
 Michoacán: 
 Nuevo León: Manuel Gómez Castro/Joaquín García
 Oaxaca: 
 Puebla: 
 Querétaro: 
 San Luis Potosí: 
 Sonora: 
 Tabasco: 
 Tamaulipas: Lucas Fernandez/José Antonio Fernández Izaguirre/Francisco Vital Fernandez
 Veracruz: Antonio López de Santa Anna/Sebastián Camacho Castilla
 Yucatán: 
 Zacatecas:

Events

 April 1 – Vicente Guerrero is sworn as President of Mexico.
 December 4 – the Plan of Jalapa is formed in Xalapa demanding the removal of Vicente Guerrero as president

Notable births
 March 25 – Ignacio Zaragoza, General of the Mexican Army best known for his 1862 victory against the French forces during the Battle of Puebla on May 5.
 July 5 – Ignacio Mariscal, distinguished lawyer, diplomat and Liberal member.

Notable deaths
 March 2 – Josefa Ortiz de Domínguez, conspirator and supporter of the Mexican War of Independence.

 
Mexico
Years of the 19th century in Mexico